The Congress Theater is a historic movie palace in the Logan Square neighborhood of Chicago.  Fridstein and Company designed it in 1926 for the movie theater operator Lubliner and Trinz. It features ornate exterior and interior design work in a combination of the Classical Revival and Italian Renaissance styles.  It was listed on the National Register of Historic Places in 2017.

In its heyday, the Congress Theater could seat over 2,904 moviegoers.  The theater block also had 17 retail storefronts with 56 apartments above.  More recently, the theater operated as a 3,500-capacity live music venue.

For years the building was a common and popular concert venue. In April 2013, the theater was shut down and had its liquor license revoked due to numerous safety code violations.  It was a source of controversy due to issues such as liquor violations, a notoriously tough security team, and lax building upkeep.

In early 2014, Carranza announced he would sell the theater to developer Michael Moyer.  Moyer planned to spend $65 million restoring the theater, with the goal of reopening the Congress in 2019. This plan, now under the ownership of Baum Revision, was approved by the City's Permit Review Committee in June, 2022. Further approval by the full City Council is required before construction may begin. The budget is reported to be $70.4 million, including $9 million in historic tax credits and $20 million in Tax Increment Funding.

Notable events
 The theater was designated a Chicago Landmark on July 10, 2002. 
 In August 2008, pop punk band Paramore recorded a live CD/DVD titled The Final Riot! at the theater. It was released in November 2008 and it was awarded in US (Gold Album) and Canada (Platinum Album).
 On  March 31, 2009, VH1 Storytellers recorded a segment on blues band ZZ Top at the Congress Theater; the show aired June 27, 2009, on VH1 Classic.
As part of his 2012 New Year's Eve performance,  producer/DJ Rusko shot the music video for hit single "Somebody to Love", released via Diplo's  Mad Decent record label.
 On March 13, 2019, the Chicago City Council approved a redevelopment agreement for the Congress Theater with related construction of residential units on N Rockwell Street and Milwaukee Avenue. The agreement included $8.85 million in tax increment financing funds.
On June 28, 2021, David Baum announced that Baum Revision has taken over the project and is planning to redevelop the landmark theater as well as the surrounding apartments and retail space, using the already approved plan (although excluding the associated 72-unit apartment building).

Gallery

References

1926 establishments in Illinois
Buildings and structures in Chicago
Neoclassical architecture in Illinois
Italian Renaissance Revival architecture in the United States
Chicago Landmarks
Music venues in Chicago
Theatres completed in 1926
Theatres in Chicago
National Register of Historic Places in Chicago